Raynerius of Split (died 1180) was an Italian Camaldolese monk. He became bishop of Cagli, from 1156 to 1175, and then archbishop of Split.

He was stoned to death in a dispute over land, defending the rights of the Church.  He is a Catholic saint and his feast day is August 4.

Notes

1180 deaths
Italian Benedictines
12th-century Italian Roman Catholic bishops
Italian saints
Canonizations by Pope Alexander VIII
Italian Christian monks
Bishops in le Marche
12th-century Croatian people
Year of birth unknown
12th-century Roman Catholic archbishops in the Republic of Venice
Archbishops of Split
Deaths by stoning